A Gert Lush Christmas is a British one-off comedy-drama film first broadcast on BBC Two on 26 December 2015. It was co-written by Russell Howard and Steve Williams, and features Howard in his acting debut. The programme also stars Kerry Howard (Russell's real life sister), Neil Morrissey, Sophie Thompson, Hannah Britland and Greg Davies.

Plot
The story centres around everyman Dan Colman (Russell Howard) who lives in London with his girlfriend Lisa (Hannah Britland). For Christmas, Dan takes Lisa to his home-town of Bamford in Bristol to meet his caring but dysfunctional family which includes his fitness-obsessed father Dave (Neil Morrissey), well-meaning but eccentric mother Sue (Sophie Thompson), charm offensive brother Jake (Dougie McMeekin), hairdresser sister Julie (Kerry Howard) and party animal Uncle Tony (Greg Davies).

What begins as over enthusiasm to welcome Lisa into the family ends with Lisa running away and making Dan regret having introduced her to them in the first place. The family then pull together in their own unstable but unique way to amend the mistakes that have been made.

Cast
 Russell Howard as Dan Colman
 Nathan Stone as young Dan
 Hannah Britland as Lisa, Dan's girlfriend
 Neil Morrissey as Dave, Dan's father
 Sophie Thompson as Sue, Dan's mother
 Kerry Howard as Julie, Dan's sister
 Felix Hayes as Trevor, Julie's husband
 Samuel Woodward as Bert, Julie and Trevor's son
 Dougie McMeekin as Jake, Dan's brother
 Maggie O'Neill as Aunty Jade
 Greg Davies as Uncle Tony
 Rosie Ede as Aunty Claire
 Pamela Lyne as Nan, Dan's paternal grandmother
 Sam Pamphillon as Mark, Dan's oldest friend
 Paddy Navin as Deirdre
 Maggie Daniels as Cath
 Larrington Walker as Roger, Dan and Lisa's neighbour
 Alun Cochrane as the barman
 Rose Johnson as the ticket woman
 Gabriel Vick as Wiggy
 Jayde Adams as Kelly
 Keith Chegwin as himself
 Pat Sharp as himself

Production
A Gert Lush Christmas was confirmed in April 2015 and filming took place in May 2015.

References

External links
  A Gert Lush Christmas on British Comedy Guide
 
  A Gert Lush Christmas on BBC iPlayer

Christmas television specials
2015 television films
2015 films
2015 in British television
BBC television comedy
BBC television dramas
Films set in the 2010s
Films set in Bristol
Films set in London